The Temple of Minerva was a temple on the short side of the Forum of Nerva in Rome. It was completed by Nerva in 97 AD, who harboured a particular devotion for goddess. It was still well-preserved in the 16th century, when pope Paul V took materials from it for his fontana dell'Acqua Paola on the Janiculum Hill and for the Borghese chapel in Santa Maria Maggiore.

See also
List of Ancient Roman temples

Bibliography
Filippo Coarelli, Guida archeologica di Roma, Verona, Arnoldo Mondadori Editore, 1984.

Building projects of the Flavian dynasty
Minerva
Temples of Minerva
Destroyed temples